Steinbach is a river of North Rhine-Westphalia, Germany, in the district Beuel of Bonn. It flows into the Vilicher Bach, which in this part is called Mühlenbach.

See also
List of rivers of North Rhine-Westphalia

Rivers of North Rhine-Westphalia
Rivers of Germany